Paraplacodus broilli is an extinct placodont sauropterygian from the middle Triassic period, from the Anisian until Ladinian stages. The fossils were uncovered in Northern Italy and the species was named in 1931 by Bernhard Peyer. Paraplacodus means "Almost Placodus", in reference to its similarity to Placodus.

Like the majority of described placodonts, Paraplacodus was an aquatic reptile that fed almost exclusively on shellfish. Most known Placodont species can be divided into two groups - the unarmored placodontoids, which would resemble a large, scaly, tooth-filled newt, or the armored cyamodontids, which would resemble a heavily armored turtle; Paraplacodus belonged to the former family.

The jaws of Paraplacodus were adapted to eat shellfish, with three pairs of protruding teeth in the top row and two rows of protruding teeth in the front of the jaw, with rounded crushing teeth in the upper and lower jaws. Thick ribs formed a box-like ribcage with an almost-square cross-section, which enabled Paraplacodus to remain close to the seabed while hunting for food.

References

Placodonts
Sauropterygian genera
Middle Triassic reptiles of Europe
Aquatic reptiles
Anisian life